Countess Maria Magdalena of Oettingen-Baldern (1619 – 31 August 1688 in Baden-Baden) was the second wife of the Margrave William of Baden-Baden.

Mary Magdalene was a daughter of Count Ernst I von Oettingen to Baldern (1584–1626) and his wife Countess Katharina von Helfenstein-Wiesensteig (1589–1638). She married Margrave William of Baden-Baden in 1650 in Vienna.

The following children were born to the marriage:
 Philip Francis William (1652 in Baden-Baden – 1655)
 Anna Maria Wilhelmina (8 September 1655 in Baden-Baden  – 22 August 1702), married in 1680 with Prince Ferdinand August of Lobkowicz (1655–1715)
 Charles Bernard (1657 in Baden-Baden – 1678 in Rheinfelden), fell in the Battle of Rheinfelden during the Franco-Dutch War
 Eva
 Maria

Countess Maria Magdalena of Oettingen-Baldern was the teacher of her step-grandson, the future Margrave Louis William of Baden-Baden after his mother did not want to live with her husband at the court in Baden-Baden and moved to Paris.  Her husband, Maria Magdalena's step-son, Hereditary Prince Ferdinand Maximilian then had his 3-months-old son kidnapped from Paris back to Baden-Baden and asked Maria Magdalena to educate him (1655).

 

  

Margravines of Baden-Baden
House of Oettingen
1619 births
1688 deaths
17th-century German people